John Nicholson (born 22 June 1949) is a former cyclist from Australia.

He competed for Australia in the 1972 Summer Olympics held in Munich, Germany in the individual sprint event where he finished in second place. He also competed at the 1968 Summer Olympics.  He won Gold at the 1970 Commonwealth Games and the 1974 Commonwealth Games also in the sprint.  He turned professional in 1975 and won the world championships in that year and also in 1976.

Nicholson was inducted into the Sport Australia Hall of Fame in 1986.

Nicholson is currently (2009) the president and a life member of the Blackburn Cycling Club in Melbourne, Australia.

References

1949 births
Australian male cyclists
Olympic cyclists of Australia
Olympic silver medalists for Australia
Cyclists at the 1968 Summer Olympics
Cyclists at the 1972 Summer Olympics
Living people
Cyclists from Melbourne
Olympic medalists in cycling
Commonwealth Games gold medallists for Australia
Cyclists at the 1970 British Commonwealth Games
Cyclists at the 1974 British Commonwealth Games
Sport Australia Hall of Fame inductees
Medalists at the 1972 Summer Olympics
UCI Track Cycling World Champions (men)
Commonwealth Games medallists in cycling
Australian track cyclists
20th-century Australian people
21st-century Australian people
Medallists at the 1970 British Commonwealth Games
Medallists at the 1974 British Commonwealth Games